The Gospel of the Egyptians is the name given to two completely separate works wholly independent of each other.

The Coptic Gospel of the Egyptians, focusing on the gnostic interpretation of the biblical Seth
The Greek Gospel of the Egyptians, a dialog conversation concerning the merits of celibacy